A spree shooting occurred in the Serbian village of Velika Ivanča in the early hours of 9 April 2013. Fourteen people (including the gunman) were killed and one, the gunman's wife, was injured. Police identified the gunman as 59-year-old Ljubiša Bogdanović, a relative of many of the victims. Bogdanović died of his injuries on 11 April 2013. The massacre was the deadliest in the country since the end of the Yugoslav Wars.

Attack
At approximately 05:00 CEST (03:00 UTC), Bogdanović shot and killed his 83-year-old mother Dobrila and his 42-year-old son Branko, and wounded his wife Javorka with a shot to the head in their home. The gunman then entered four neighboring houses, killing five men, five women, and a two-year-old child, most of whom were shot in the head while they were sleeping. The weapon used was reported to be a CZ-88 9mm pistol. The killing spree ended when police arrived at the scene after a call from Javorka Bogdanović. They found Ljubiša Bogdanović in the backyard of his house. He committed suicide, shooting himself in the head.

Twelve of the victims died at the scene, and one victim died later that day at a Belgrade hospital. Bogdanović and his wife were taken to hospital, each in critical condition. Ljubiša Bogdanović died from his injuries two days later.

Fatalities
Ljubiša Bogdanović, 60, gunman
Branko Bogdanović, 42, son of Ljubiša Bogdanović
Dobrila Bogdanović, 83, mother of Ljubiša Bogdanović
Mihajlo Despotović, 61, cousin of Ljubiša Bogdanović
Milena Despotović, 61, wife of Mihajlo Despotović
Goran Despotović, 23, grandson of Mihajlo and Milena Despotović
Jovana Despotović, 21, wife of Goran Despotović
David Despotović, 2, son of Goran and Jovana Despotović
Ljubina Ješić, 64
Miloš Ješić, 48, son of Ljubina Ješić
Velimir Mijailović, 78
Olga Mijailović, 79, wife of Velimir Mijailović
Danica Stekić, 78
Dragana Stekić, 50, daughter of Danica Stekić, cousin of Ljubiša Bogdanović

Perpetrator

Ljubiša Bogdanović (4 March 1953 – 11 April 2013) was born in Velika Ivanča. His father committed suicide when he was a child, and he and his brother Radmilo were brought up by their grandfather Obrad, who was said to have been extremely strict and beat him when he made any mistakes. He was a Serb veteran of the Croatian War of Independence, having served for four and a half months, and had held a firearm permit since 1981. Bogdanović and his son Branko had been employees of a Slovenian wood-processing factory in Mladenovac until 2012 when both lost their jobs.

Some residents described Bogdanović as a "quiet guy". However, it was also said that he had a domestic violence history and had a dispute with his son about his relationship with a girl of whom Ljubiša Bogdanović did not approve.

Although Bogdanović was not known to have suffered from mental illness, his family had a history of such illness. Besides Bogdanović's father committing suicide, his cousin and uncle suffered from mental illnesses, the latter being treated and eventually dying in a mental institution.

Response
A special meeting of the Serbian cabinet was called in response to the shooting. The government declared 10 April 2013 to be a day of mourning.

See also
Gun politics in Serbia
Jabukovac killings
Žitište shooting

References

Attacks in Europe in 2013
Massacres in Serbia
Deaths by firearm in Serbia
Mass murder in 2013
Spree shootings in Serbia
Murder–suicides in Europe
April 2013 crimes in Europe
April 2013 events in Europe
2013 mass shootings in Europe
2013 murders in Serbia
Familicides